Susan Kathleen Rankin, FBA, FSA, is a musicologist. Since 2006, she has been Professor of Medieval Music at the University of Cambridge; she has also been a Fellow of Emmanuel College, Cambridge, since 1981 (having previously been a research fellow there for three years). Rankin completed her undergraduate degree at Newnham College, Cambridge, in 1975, and then graduated from King's College London with a Master of Music degree the following year; in 1982, she was awarded a doctorate by the University of Cambridge. From 1981 to 1984, she was a Research Fellow at Emmanuel College before becoming a Fellow. In 1990, Rankin was appointed an assistant lecturer in Medieval Music at Cambridge; she was promoted three years later to lecturer, and then to reader in 1999. Since 2013, she has also been Chair of the Henry Bradshaw Society. According to her British Academy profile, her research relates to "Western medieval music and its transmission and notation from the origins to the thirteenth century and the development of the Latin liturgy, with an especial focus on ritual".

Honours 
Rankin was awarded the Dent Medal by the Royal Musical Association in 1995. In 2006, she was elected to the fellowship of the Society of Antiquaries of London (FSA), and in 2009 was also elected a Fellow of the British Academy (FBA), the United Kingdom's national academy for the humanities and social sciences.

Selected works 
 The Music of the Medieval Liturgical Drama in France and England, 2 vols (Garland, 1989)
 
 (Co-edited with D. Hiley) Music in the Medieval English Liturgy: Plainsong and Medieval Music Society Centennial Essays (Oxford University Press, 1993)
 (Co-edited with W. Arlt) Stiftsbibliothek St Gallen Codices 484 & 381, 3 vols (Amadeus, 1996)
 The Winchester Troper: Introduction and Facsimile, Early English Church Music series, no. 50 (Stainer and Bell, 2007)

References   

Living people
English musicologists
Alumni of Newnham College, Cambridge
Alumni of King's College London
Fellows of Emmanuel College, Cambridge
Fellows of the British Academy
Fellows of the Society of Antiquaries of London
Corresponding Fellows of the Medieval Academy of America
Year of birth missing (living people)